The Greek women's handball cup is an annual competition, the most important in Greek women's handball together with the Greek championship. The first winner was GE Veria in 1987. Anagennisi Artas holds the record of cups won with nine consecutive titles between 1998 and 2006. Ormi Patras was the team that put an end to that domination by winning the title on May 13, 2007.

The finals

Titles by team 

 Thriamvos Patron took part in the 2001 final before merging with the 2 other clubs that created Ormi Patras.

References 

 Greek handball federation's official website,

External links
handball.org.gr

Handball in Greece